Source control is a strategy for reducing disease transmission by blocking respiratory secretions produced through speaking, coughing, sneezing or singing. Surgical masks are commonly used for this purpose, with cloth face masks recommended for use by the public only in epidemic situations when there are shortages of surgical masks. In addition, respiratory etiquette such as covering the mouth and nose with a tissue when coughing can be considered source control. In diseases transmitted by droplets or aerosols, understanding air flow, particle and aerosol transport may lead to rational infrastructural source control measures that minimize exposure of susceptible persons.


Mechanisms 

Infections in general may spread by direct contact (for example, shaking hands or kissing), by inhaling infectious droplets in the air (droplet transmission), by inhaling long-lasting aerosols with tiny particles (airborne transmission), and by touching objects with infectious material on their surfaces (fomites). Different diseases spread in different ways; some spread by only some of these routes. For instance, fomite transmission of COVID-19 is thought to be rare while aerosol, droplet and contact transmission appear to be the primary transmission modes, .

Coughs and sneezes can spread airborne droplets up to ~. Speaking can spread droplets up to ~. It may be difficult to maintain these distances. For a masked person, or even one sneezing or coughing into a tissue or elbow, these distances are reduced.

Masking any person who may be a source of infectious droplets (or aerosols) thus reduces the unsafe range of physical distances. If a person can be infectious before they are symptomatic and diagnosed, then people who do not yet know if they are infectious may also be a source of infection.

Handwashing helps to protect people against contact transmission, and against indirect droplet transmission. Handwashing removes infectious droplets that their mask caught (from either side) and which transferred to their hands when they touched their mask.

For pathogens transmitted through the air, strategies to block cough air jets and to capture aerosols, e.g. the "Shield & Sink" approach, can be highly effective in minimizing exposure to respiratory secretions.

Contrast with personal protective equipment 

While source control protects others from transmission arising from the wearer, personal protective equipment protects the wearer themselves. Cloth face masks can be used for source control but are not considered personal protective equipment as they have low filter efficiency (generally varying between 2–60%), although they are easy to obtain and reusable after washing. There are no standards or regulation for self-made cloth face masks.

Surgical masks are designed to protect against splashes and sprays, but do not provide complete respiratory protection from germs and other contaminants because of the loose fit between the surface of the face mask and the face.  Surgical masks are regulated by various national standards to have high bacterial filtration efficiency (BFE).  N95/N99/N100 masks and other filtering facepiece respirators can provide source control in addition to respiratory protection, but respirators with an unfiltered exhalation valve may not provide source control and require additional measures to filter exhalation air when source control is required.

COVID-19 pandemic 

During the COVID-19 pandemic, cloth face masks for source control have been recommended by the U.S. Centers for Disease Control and Prevention (CDC) for members of the public who leave their homes, and health care facilities are commended to consider requiring face masks for all people who enter the facility.  Health care personnel and patients with COVID-19 symptoms are recommended to use surgical masks if available, as they are more protective.  Masking patients reduces the personal protective equipment recommended by CDC for health care personnel under crisis shortage conditions.

The World Health Organization and European Centre for Disease Prevention and Control recommend face masks in non-healthcare community settings in severe epidemic situations with a high prevalence of asymptomatic but infectious persons, especially when visiting crowded indoor spaces such as grocery stores, public transportation, and for certain workers who must  come into physical proximity with many other people.

References 

Respiratory diseases